, produced by Otsuka Chemical Holdings Co., Ltd., (distributed and sold by Otsuka Pharmaceutical Co.) is a carbonated beverage available in Japan. It is commonly called Oronamin C or Oronamin. Its name is similar to the Takeda Pharmaceutical Co. product "Arinamin" and its name comes from Otsuka's own  and its main ingredient, vitamin C. Oronamin C was named after the Oronine H Ointment in hopes that it would prove to be equally successful.

Product summary
Oronamin C was introduced in February 1965 and was initially sold in a 120 ml glass bottle sealed with a bottle cap. It contains isoleucine and many other essential amino acids as well as many vitamins such as vitamin B2, vitamin B6 and vitamin C. It is not only available in supermarkets and convenience stores in Japan, but also in Otsuka Pharmaceutical Co. vending machines as well. The bottle cap was briefly replaced with a screw bottle cap, but following a nationwide scare during the 1980s regarding a large number of poisoned sealed bottled beverages known as the Paraquat murders, this screw cap was replaced with a one-time "pull-cap," which cannot be re-sealed after opening. Child welfare activist  wrote that the previous screw caps allowed individuals to put in paint thinner and then re-seal the bottles.

In 2000, a "sister" product  was introduced. It contains royal jelly and propolis extracts.

While originally sold as a medical health drink with carbonation added, the Japanese Ministry of Health and Welfare filed a claim resulting in the judgement that Oronamin C could not be labeled as a medical health drink. This was a difficult time for Otsuka Pharmaceutical Co., but before long, the  television advertisement featuring comedian  became recognizable nationwide, and Oronamin C grew into a best-selling health drink in Japan.

In the past, many competing companies have introduced similar health drinks in an attempt to topple the current market oligopoly, but so far, none have been successful (see ).

Commercials
The initial spokesperson for this campaign was comedian Kon Omura. This campaign appeared for about 10 years. In the mid-1960s television advertisements and enamel billboards were used for marketing Oronamin along with other Otsuka Group products. Japanese baseball players from the Yomiuri Giants also promoted Oronamin with the phrase . The tagline  was also used in some advertisements.

The popular Japanese singing group SMAP's songs became featured in Oronamin commercials in 1994 and 1995. Around 2001, a television campaign called "Let's find the Yujiro of the 21st century!" debuted featuring actors from Ishihara International Productions, Inc. Since then, many famous tarento have promoted Oronamin. Hideki Matsui worked as a spokesperson for sister product Oronamin C Royal Prolis during his career with the Yomiuri Giants.

Another version of Oronamin television advertisements were broadcast along with the Giants version, featuring Yūzō Kayama and the Southern All Stars.

Starting in 2004 a tie-in was established with the hit Japanese Kamen Rider Series. Actors Takayuki Tsubaki, Shigeki Hosokawa, Hiro Mizushima, Takeru Satoh, Kōji Seto, and Masahiro Inoue; who appear in Kamen Rider Blade, Hibiki, Kabuto, Den-O, Kiva and Kamen Rider Decade; have promoted Oronamin with special television commercials. In 2009, the animators who did the Fresh Pretty Cure! series also did the same. 2015 saw Kamen Rider actors starring in commercials as a trio. These trios include Shun Nishime, Ryosuke Yamamoto and Hayato Isomura (Kamen Rider Ghost); Hiroki Iijima, Toshiki Seto and Ukyo Matsumoto (Kamen Rider Ex-Aid); Atsuhiro Inukai, Eiji Akaso and Kouhei Takeda (Kamen Rider Build); So Okuno, Gaku Oshida, and Keisuke Watanabe (Kamen Rider Zi-O); Fumiya Takahashi, Ryutaro Okada, and Hiroe Igeta (Kamen Rider Zero-One); and Syuichiro Naito, Takaya Yamaguchi, and Ryo Aoki (Kamen Rider Saber).

Current television commercials feature Japanese idol Aya Ueto as the main cast appearing along with a costar sports athlete or other celebrity. Aya's conversations with each celebrity are the topic of these commercials. Initially her co-stars answered "Of course!" but now answer .

Selected tarento who have appeared with Aya Ueto:

Tsuyoshi Shinjo (Hokkaido Nippon Ham Fighters baseball player; first baseball player to promote in this campaign)
Bae Yong-joon (Korean actor)
Hideaki Takizawa (actor, tarento; from the 2005 NHK Taiga drama Yoshitsune; Hideaki appears as Yoshitsune)
Bobby Ologun (tarento, martial artist: in President)
Kamenashi Kazuya and Jin Akanishi (KAT-TUN: in School Headmaster)
Shunsuke Nakamura (Celtic F.C. soccer player: in Sports Newspaper Reporter)
Michelle Wie (pro golfer: in Long Putt Knack)
Obi Tenaka (actor, tarento)
Kazuo Umezu (manga artist: in Teacher Umeza's Surprise)
Ryo Nishikido, Tadayoshi Ohkura (Kanjani∞: in Kanjani Can't Enter?)
Hakuhō Shō (Ōzeki sumo wrestler)
Daisuke Takahashi (figure skater: in Outside Work)
Tohoshinki (Korean boy group)
Jackie Chan (actor, stuntman)
Jun Hyun-moo (host)

Genki hatsuratsū? advertisement battle
For about a half year starting May 9, 2005, the Genki hatsuratsū? advertisement battle was held for all young members of the Yoshimoto Kogyo Japanese entertainment conglomerate. Performers were to plan and create an original television commercial, and these commercials would compete against each other. The prize was 8,202 dollars and the possession of broadcasting rights in the winners hometown. Among the many contestants, Nibunnogo! was the winner with Tōtarutenbosu in second place. For a full list of participants see the Japanese Wikipedia Oronamin article.

Oronamin shake
In 1971, a television advertisement "Home Party" introduced the recipe for the Oronamin Shake: Oronamin C mixed with a raw egg. Even today that recipe is featured on the Oronamin C recipe webpage, though using only an egg yolk is recommended nowadays. The television advertisement introduced the shake with the copy "My older sister and I have Oronamin and juice. Mom puts in an egg and has an Oronamin shake. Dad has Oronamin and gin." In 2004 a television advertisement featuring model Ai Tominaga (冨永愛 Tominaga Ai, born August 1, 1983) and singer-songwriter Shigeru Izumiya (泉谷しげる Izumiya Shigeru, born May 11, 1948) reintroduced the Oronamin shake.

Similar products
 (Tamura Co., introduced 1991)
 (Bonnu Corporation, introduced May 1983 )
 (All Japan Drug)
 (Daikyo Yakuhin, including oligosaccharide)
 (Okuda Chemical Industry)
 (Aiku, ÆON Co., Ltd.)
 (Automatic Sales)
 /  (Tokiwa Pharmaceutical Co.,Ltd.)
 (Sanbon Coffee)
Turbo C / New Turbo C (PepsiCo., same name as the C language compiler Turbo C)
 /  (Suntoryfoods Limited)
 (SANGARIA)
 (Coca-Cola Japan)
 /  (Asahi Soft Drinks)
 (Riken Pharmecauticals)
 (Nagoya Milk)
Oligomin C
Citrumin C (Zam Zam cola company, UAE, Iran)
Vitaene C (Pokka)
C1000 (House Wellness Foods Corporation; part of House Foods; formerly produced by Takeda Pharmaceutical Company)
C+ (Australia)
Pocari Sweat (Otsuka Pharmaceutical)

References

External links
 Oronamin C Drink, official product site from Otsuka Pharmaceutical Co. 
 Otsuka Pharmaceutical Co., Ltd. 
 Otsuka Pharmaceutical Group

Energy drinks
Soft drinks
Japanese drinks
Products introduced in 1965
Otsuka Pharmaceutical